Port Said Airport  serves the city of Port Said, Egypt, at the north end of the Suez Canal. In 2011, the airport served 36,962 passengers (-5.5% vs. 2010).

Modernisation
The airport underwent a modernisation program with a partial inauguration in February 2011. The airport is seen to be vital for the coastal city and to sustain its industrial expansion plans.

Airlines and destinations 
There are currently no scheduled services to and from the airport.

Accidents and incidents
During a training flight on 15 January 2008, a Beech C90B King Air operated by the Nuclear Centre Survey crashed 500 meters from the airport while performing circuits, killing both the pilot and training pilot.

References

External links
 
 

Airports in Egypt
Port Said